Fontmatrix is a font manager for Linux desktop environments. It can manage fonts installed system-wide or for individual user accounts. It relies on FreeType to render font samples, and on Qt for its user interface. Bruce Byfield hailed the creation of Fontmatrix with an article concluding with: "Finally, the long wait for a GNU/Linux font manager is ending."

Fontmatrix lets users label a font with multiple tags (similar to Gmail labels), which may be activated or deactivated as sets. It also allows the user to toggle features of OpenType fonts for testing purposes. As of November 2008, the PANOSE classification present in fonts may also be used to select them by similarity.

See also
 Font management software

References 
 Bruce Byfield (December 5, 2007), Fontmatrix: Font management for the desktop finally arrives, linux.com
 Sachin  Dhall (September 5, 2008), 25  Font Management Tools Reviewed, Smashing Magazine
 Alexandre Prokoudine (July 17, 2009), Fontmatrix 0.6.0, libregraphicsworld.org

External links 
  
 

Font managers
Software that uses Qt
Typography-related software for Linux